Cheluva  is a 1997 Kannada comedy-drama film directed and enacted by V. Ravichandran in dual roles. The rest of the cast includes Gautami, Meena, Suman and Tiger Prabhakar among others. The film is a remake of Telugu film Hello Brother. The film was also twice remade in Hindi as Judwaa starring Salman Khan, Karisma Kapoor and Rambha and Judwaa 2 (2017) starring Varun Dhawan, Jacqueline Fernandez and Taapsee Pannu and in Bengali as Bhaijaan Elo Re (2018) starring Shakib Khan, Srabanti Chatterjee and Payel Sarkar.

The film featured an original score and soundtrack composed and written by Hamsalekha and was produced by S. Ramesh for Mahalakshmi Pictures banner.

Plot
Cheluva and Vijay, two twin brothers, are separated in their childhood by Raghuram, a well-known criminal. Cheluva is left on the streets by Raghuram and becomes a small-time criminal. Vijay was brought up under his parents' guidance and is a well-known engineer. After several years, Cheluva has come face to face with his family. The rest of the film deals with the confusion the family face due to the lookalikes of Cheluva and Vijay.

Cast 

 V. Ravichandran (double acting) as Cheluva/Vijay
 Gautami as Moha 
 Meena as Meena
 Tiger Prabhakar as Police Officer Prathap 
 Kazan Khan as Kodanda, an evil 
 Mukhyamantri Chandru as sidekick of Kodanda 
 Srinivasa Murthy
 Umashree as lady PC
 Bank Janardhan as Bhandlee Bhandari
 Doddanna as Head P.C. 
 Tennis Krishna as PK
 B. V. Radha as Akhilandeshwari, Mother of Moha 
 Sumithra
 Bhavyasri Rai
 Padma Vasanthi
 Sundar Raj
 Pramila Joshai
 Ponnambalam 
 Vijay Kashi
 Bank Suresh 
 Stunt Siddu 
 Shiva Kumar
 Dingri Nagaraj
 Sarigama Viji 
 M. D. Kaushik

Soundtrack 
The music was composed and written by Hamsalekha.

References 

1997 films
1990s Kannada-language films
Twins in Indian films
Films scored by Hamsalekha
Indian action comedy films
Kannada remakes of Telugu films
Films directed by V. Ravichandran
Indian romantic comedy films
1997 action comedy films
1997 romantic comedy films